Gerhard Johannes Krieger from the German Aerospace Center (DLR), Wessling, Bavaria, Germany was named Fellow of the Institute of Electrical and Electronics Engineers (IEEE) in 2013 for contributions to advanced synthetic aperture radar systems.

References

External links

20th-century births
Living people
Fellow Members of the IEEE
Year of birth missing (living people)
Place of birth missing (living people)